Yevgeni Sergeyevich Popov (born 27 November 1977 in Krasnoyarsk) is a Russian bobsledder who has competed since 1996. Competing in four Winter Olympics, he earned his best finish of eighth twice (two-man: 2002, four-man: 2010).

At the FIBT World Championships, Popov earned his best finish of sixth in the four-man event at St. Moritz in 2007.

He won the Bobsleigh World Cup championship in the four-man event in 2006-07.

References
2002 bobsleigh two-man results
2002 bobsleigh four-man results
2006 bobsleigh two-man results
2006 bobsleigh four-man results
Bobsleighsport.com profile

List of four-man bobsleigh World Cup champions since 1985

1977 births
Living people
Sportspeople from Krasnoyarsk
Russian male bobsledders
Bobsledders at the 1998 Winter Olympics
Bobsledders at the 2002 Winter Olympics
Bobsledders at the 2006 Winter Olympics
Bobsledders at the 2010 Winter Olympics
Olympic bobsledders of Russia